In Colour is the debut studio album by English producer Jamie xx, released on 29 May 2015 by Young Turks. The album was composed during a five-year period while a member of the indie pop band the xx, starting with his production on xx in 2009. After starting his solo career with the remix album We're New Here (2011) and singles like "All Under One Roof Raving" (2014), he was intent on making the album something of a departure from his previous work and genre. The album features guest vocals from fellow the xx members Romy and Oliver Sim, as well as from Young Thug and Popcaan. The album produced five singles: "Girl" and "Sleep Sound" as a double-single on 5 May 2014, "Loud Places" on 27 March 2015, "Gosh" on 4 May, and "I Know There's Gonna Be (Good Times)" on 22 May.

In Colour received widespread acclaim from critics. It debuted at number three on the UK Albums Chart, selling 19,255 copies in its first week. In the United States, the album entered the Billboard 200 at number 21 and topped the Dance/Electronic Albums, with first-week sales of 19,000 copies. It was nominated for the 2015 Mercury Prize, MasterCard British Album of the Year at the 2016 Brit Awards and Best Dance/Electronic Album at the 58th Grammy Awards.

Background and composition
Smith produced the xx's debut album, xx (2009), "by accident" after sessions with other producers including Diplo were unsuccessful. Later in 2009, Smith began his solo career when he remixed Florence and the Machine's "You've Got the Love". Smith was invited by XL Recordings owner Richard Russell to remix Gil Scott-Heron's 2010 album I'm New Here in its entirety. The resulting album, the electronic-based We're New Here, was released in 2011. He released his debut single, the double A-side "Far Nearer" / "Beat For" in June 2011. The following year, Smith used samples from We're New Here on Drake's "Take Care", which became a US top-10 hit. In Colour was announced on 23 March 2015.

The album was composed over five years, with Smith struggling to finish the music once he had started making it. Smith wanted to make an album that sounded like it did not come from any particular era. It is an electronica and dance record, blending styles of UK garage, house and rave. Smith used vocal samples from British media sources that he had encountered while away on tour. The vocal sample at the beginning of "Girl" is taken from an episode of the British drama television series Top Boy, and "Gosh" features a clip from a BBC Radio 1 programme called One in the Jungle that was never aired. "Seesaw" was recorded in collaboration with Kieran Hebden. "I Know There's Gonna Be (Good Times)" is based around a sample of The Persuasions' 1971 song "Good Times" from their album Street Corner Symphony, which Smith had bought in Detroit. The song features vocals by American rapper Young Thug and Jamaican musician Popcaan, which were recorded separately and spliced together by Smith.

Promotion

Singles
The first single from the album, "Sleep Sound", premiered on 27 March 2014. A music video for "Sleep Sound", directed by Sofia Mattioli and featuring 13 members of the Manchester Deaf Centre, was released on 10 April 2014. The second single from the album, "Girl", was released on 18 April 2014. "Girl" and "Sleep Sound" were later released as a double A-side on 5 May 2014. On 25 March 2015, the tracks "Gosh" and "Loud Places" premiered on Annie Mac.

Music videos
On 27 March, a music video for "Loud Places", featuring Jamie xx and the xx bandmate Romy Madley Croft skateboarding at night in London, was released. On 27 April 2015, a music video for "Gosh" was released. On 11 May 2015, the song "I Know There's Gonna Be (Good Times)", featuring Young Thug and Popcaan, was released.

Release
On 26 May 2015, In Colour was streamed in its entirety on iTunes. In Colour was released on 29 May 2015 in digital, CD, LP and a limited deluxe triple-LP edition. The deluxe edition of the album, cut on coloured vinyl, featured two exclusive instrumental tracks.

In 2016, it was awarded a gold certification from the Independent Music Companies Association, indicating sales of at least 75,000 copies throughout Europe.

Critical reception

In Colour received widespread acclaim from critics. At Metacritic, which assigns a weighted mean rating out of 100 top reviews from mainstream publications, the album received an average score of 87, based on 39 reviews. Q magazine praised it as "an album so rich, complex and dazzlingly fluid" in a rave review, while Pitchforks Mark Richardson called it a "dazzling culmination of Jamie xx's last six years of work, gathering up elements of everything he’s done—moody ballads, floor-filling bangers, expansive and off-kilter collaborations with vocalists—and packing them tightly into a glittering ball that reflects spinning fragments of feeling back at us." Nina Corcoran of Consequence of Sound gave the album a grade of A, writing "Each song grows richer the more you explore its open space. Its minimalism breathes buckets of color. After one listen or 10, In Colour reflects brightly, a phenomenally poised and universally approachable solo debut." In another positive review, Phil Hebblethwaite of NME wrote "[O]n an album defined by its creator making perfect choices, it fits, and you'd never know that Jamie cobbled ‘In Colour’ together on downtime over the last seven year." Gareth James of Clash called the album "an emotive, emphatic and often joyous collection of music that plays equally for the head and the heart." Robert Christgau wrote in Noisey that while the music functioned poorly as background music, listening to the record in the foreground left him captivated by the music's "glimmers of beat, snatches of melody, trick sounds, and fluctuating dynamics as well as the hooks with which most tracks are equipped and around which few are structured".

In a less enthusiastic review, Andrew Ryce from Resident Advisor remarks that In Colour is an "uneven album that's rarely as profound or as meaningful as it tries to be". In another mixed review, The Quietuss Christian Eede called the album "a collection of sexless, sonically conservative tracks overwrought in bass and nostalgia, and largely void of personality – club music for the neoliberal age."

Accolades
The album was nominated for the 2015 Mercury Music Prize and Best Dance/Electronic Album at the 58th Grammy Awards.

In 2019, Pitchfork ranked the album at number 25 in their list of "The 200 Best Albums of the 2010s"; editor Puja Patel wrote: "In Colour was the result of [Jamie xx's] self-directed club education, a collection of influences—’90s jungle, swaggy doo-wop, the exaltation of trance, and the tension of two-step—that were reverent of the past but wary of nostalgia. It’s the sound of longing and loneliness mixed with the joyful relief of discovering that you've been among friends all along."

Track listing
All tracks produced by Jamie Smith, except "SeeSaw", produced by Smith and Kieran Hebden.

Sample credits
 "Gosh" includes samples of BBC Radio 1's One in the Jungle.
 "Sleep Sound" contains elements from "Karma" written by Taneisha Smith, Kerry Brothers and Alicia Augello-Cook; and "It's a Blue World" written by Bob Wright and Chett Forrest.
 "SeeSaw" contains an interpolation of "See Saw", written by Peter Buffett, Mary Buffett, Jeff Mehl, Billy Guy and Sylvia Robinson; and elements from Mark Leckey's video Fiorucci Made Me Hardcore (1999).
 "Obvs" contains samples from "Paradise of Replica" by After Dinner; and "Stimela (Cool Train)", as performed by Hugh Masekela.
 "Hold Tight" contains a sample from "Sun City – The UK Garage Innovators", as featured in the documentary Rewind 4Ever: The History of UK Garage, directed by Alex Lawton.
 "Loud Places" contains a sample of "Could Heaven Ever Be Like This" by Idris Muhammad.
 "I Know There's Gonna Be (Good Times)" contains a sample of the recording "Good Times" as performed by The Persuasions; and All Junglists – A London Somet'ing Dis'''.
 "Girl" contains an extract from Top Boy; a portion of "Burning" as written by Sebastian Maschat, Erlend Oeye and Marcin Öz, and performed and recorded by The Whitest Boy Alive; also samples "Our Prayer" written by Brian Wilson; "Out There" recorded by Studio, written by Rasmus Hägg and Dan Lissvik and produced by Lissvik; and "I.O.U" performed by Freeez and written by Arthur Baker and John Robie.

Personnel
Credits adapted from the liner notes of In Colour''.

 Jamie Smith – performance; production, recording ; mixing ; artwork
 Romy – vocals ; guitar ; vocal samples 
 Oliver Sim – vocals 
 Young Thug – vocals 
 Popcaan – vocals 
 Novelist – additional background sample 
 Four Tet – production 
 Rodaidh McDonald – engineering 
 Tom Elmhirst – mixing 
 David Wrench – mixing 
 Joe Visciano – additional engineering ; mixing assistance 
 Mandy Parnell – mastering
 Phil Lee – artwork

Charts

Weekly charts

Year-end charts

Certifications

Release history

References

External links
 

2015 debut albums
Jamie xx albums
Albums produced by Jamie xx
Young Turks (record label) albums